Alfred Reid may refer to:
 Alfred Reid (bishop) (?–2019), bishop of the Anglican Diocese of Jamaica
 Alfred Reid (Australian politician) (1867–1945), Australian politician in the New South Wales Legislative Assembly
 Alfred E. Reid (1891–1955), Canadian politician in the Nova Scotia House of Assembly
 Alf Reid (Alfred J. Reid), college football player and chemist